On the Loose is an EP released by the Swedish heavy metal band Europe in April 1985. It is the soundtrack to the Swedish 1985 film On the Loose. The first two songs, "Rock the Night" and "On the Loose" were later re-recorded in a lighter and heavier way respectively for the album The Final Countdown.

Track listing

Personnel
Joey Tempest – vocals on all tracks, guitar, bass, keyboards, drum machine on tracks 2, 3
John Norum – guitar on tracks 1, 2
John Levén – bass on track 1
Mic Michaeli – keyboards on track 1
Ian Haugland – drums on track 1

Europe (band) albums
Film soundtracks
1985 EPs
1985 soundtrack albums
Epic Records soundtracks
Epic Records EPs